is a former Japanese football player.

Playing career
Sato was born in Hiroshima on 12 April 1966. After graduating from high school, he joined his local club Mazda (later Sanfrecce Hiroshima) in 1985. He played many matches as center back. The club won the 2nd place in 1987 Emperor's Cup. Although his opportunity to play decreased in early 1990s, he became a regular player again from 1994. The club won the 2nd place in 1994 J1 League and 1995 Emperor's Cup. His opportunity to play decreased in 1996 and he moved to Japan Football League club Oita Trinity in 1997. He retired at the end of 1997 season.

Club statistics

References

External links

biglobe.ne.jp

1966 births
Living people
Association football people from Hiroshima Prefecture
Japanese footballers
Japan Soccer League players
J1 League players
Japan Football League (1992–1998) players
Sanfrecce Hiroshima players
Oita Trinita players
Association football defenders